The Smurf Apprentice (original French title L'Apprenti Schtroumpf) is the seventh album of the original French-language Smurfs comic series created by Belgian artist Peyo.

Apart from the titular one, it contains other two stories: Smurftraps and Romeo and Smurfette.

Plots

The Smurf Apprentice
A smurf wants to learn magic and alchemy. After some failed attempts of getting Papa Smurf's magic book, he goes to Gargamel's lab and steals one page of his magic book. However, what the potion written on the page does is written on the following page, so the only way to know what the potion does is to test it. After some failed attempts of giving the potion to the other smurfs, the Apprentice Smurf drinks it himself and becomes a green lizard-like monster that the other smurfs (save for Papa Smurf) are afraid of. Not one of Papa Smurf's attempts on an antidote works, so the Apprentice Smurf goes to Gargamel's lab after the antidote, but is captured. Papa Smurf leads the other smurfs to save him, and then they make the antidote that restores the Apprentice Smurf to his normal smurf appearance.

Smurftraps
Gargamel prepares a series of traps to capture the smurfs, while they are playing hide-and-seek. Brainy Smurf is trapped by a book, Greedy Smurf is immobilised by a sticky cake, Grouchy Smurf follows a series of directions that lead him to a hole, and so on. But the smurf who was counting watches when Gargamel catches the last of his playmates, and goes to the village to tell Papa Smurf, who then organises all the remaining smurfs for a rescue mission. However, Gargamel catches all the rescue party, save for Papa Smurf, with a giant net. Gargamel makes the smurfs do slave labor on his home, but Papa Smurf arrives at night and leaves a trace of gold coins near Gargamel's bed. When Gargamel awakens, he finds the trace and follows it to a chest where Papa Smurf traps him. Papa Smurf releases the smurfs and they leave Gargamel's home.

Romeo and Smurfette
A series of one-page gags showing the love all the smurfs feel for Smurfette.

Publication and other media
In the Hanna-Barbera cartoon version of The Smurf Apprentice, Clumsy Smurf is the one who becomes the apprentice rather than the unnamed smurf from the comic.
The animated version of Romeo and Smurfette links the gags as one story, where Gargamel (who did not appear on any one of the gags) uses a magic flower to make Smurfette decide that she will marry Handy Smurf or Hefty Smurf, thus dividing the Smurfs between Handy's supporters and Hefty's supporters. The episode also uses some scenes adapted from Smurf Versus Smurf.

See also 
Characters in The Smurfs

The Smurfs books